Gregory Alfred Martinez is a former professional outfielder. Martinez was drafted by the Milwaukee Brewers in the twenty-fourth round of the 1993 Major League Baseball Draft. He played with the team at the Major League Baseball in 1998.

Martinez played at the collegiate level at Barstow Community College.

References

External links
, or Retrosheet, or Pura Pelota (Venezuelan Winter League)

1972 births
Living people
American expatriate baseball players in Mexico
Arizona League Athletics players
Arizona League Brewers players
Atlantic City Surf players
Barstow Vikings baseball players
Baseball players from Nevada
Beloit Brewers players
Durham Bulls players
El Paso Diablos players
Grosseto Baseball Club players
American expatriate baseball players in Italy
Guerreros de Oaxaca players
Helena Brewers players
Huntsville Stars players
Louisville Redbirds players
Louisville RiverBats players
Major League Baseball left fielders
Mexican League baseball center fielders
Midland RockHounds players
Milwaukee Brewers players
Modesto A's players
Orlando Rays players
Solano Steelheads players
Sportspeople from the Las Vegas Valley
St. George Pioneerzz players
Stockton Ports players
Tiburones de La Guaira players
American expatriate baseball players in Venezuela
Tucson Toros players
Vaqueros Laguna players